Sven Tobias Müller (born 16 February 1996) is a German professional footballer who plays as a goalkeeper for Dynamo Dresden.

Club career

1. FC Köln
After signing from SC West Köln in 2004, Müller progressed through 1. FC Köln's youth system, eventually reaching the club's second team in 2014. Müller made 13 appearances for the second team through 2016, before moving up to the first team squad for the 2016–17 season. He earned the third spot on the depth chart at goalkeeper, behind Timo Horn and Thomas Kessler, when previous number three Daniel Mesenhöler was transferred away to Union Berlin. Manager Peter Stöger described him as a "young, talented goalkeeper, but already pretty hard-nosed".

On 20 August 2016, Müller was thrust into action, making his first team debut in the DFB-Pokal facing sixth-tier BFC Preussen, with Horn away on national Olympic duty and Kessler out with a torn knee ligament sustained in preseason training. Müller got the chance to make his Bundesliga debut shortly thereafter, facing VfL Wolfsburg at the Volkswagen Arena on 10 September 2016, earning the start after Horn sustained an injury to his hip. Müller came through with a four-save clean sheet to give Köln a goalless draw.

Hallescher FC
In September 2020, Müller joined Hallescher FC from Karlsruher SC.

Career statistics

References

Living people
1996 births
German footballers
Footballers from Cologne
Association football goalkeepers
Germany youth international footballers
Bundesliga players
Regionalliga players
3. Liga players
1. FC Köln players
1. FC Köln II players
Karlsruher SC players
Hallescher FC players
Dynamo Dresden players